Dana Lee Lynch (born March 26, 1949) is an American politician and a Democratic member of the West Virginia House of Delegates representing District 44 from January 12, 2013 to January 9, 2019. He was defeated on November 8, 2018 by 19-year-old Caleb Hanna.

Elections
2012 To challenge Democratic Representative Joe Talbott (who had been redistricted from District 36), Lynch ran in the three-way May 8, 2012 Democratic Primary and placed first with 1,339 votes (37.8%) ahead of Representative Talbott, and won the November 6, 2012 General election with 3,351 votes (59.9%) against Republican nominee Robert Karnes.

References

External links
Official page at the West Virginia Legislature

Dana Lynch at Ballotpedia
Dana L. Lynch at OpenSecrets

1949 births
Living people
Democratic Party members of the West Virginia House of Delegates
People from Webster County, West Virginia
21st-century American politicians